Berit Winge Brænne (18 September 1918 – 6 September 1976) was a Norwegian actress, children's writer and songwriter.

Personal life
She was born in Aker, a daughter of architect Sigmund Brænne and Bodil Winge, and sister of actress Randi Brænne. She was married to sculptor Hugo Frank Wathne from 1950 to 1951. She was a sister-in-law of actor Frank Robert.

Career
Brænne made her stage debut at the Oslo theatre Masken in 1938, and worked the next twelve years as actress at various theatres in Oslo, Bergen and Stavanger. From 1946 she contributed with songs and audio plays to the radio show Lørdagsbarnetimen (the Saturday children's hour) for the Norwegian Broadcasting Corporation. From 1954 she contributed to the popular morning show Barnetimen for de minste. Her first story here was Dukkemannen Tulleruskomsnusk; this was later published as a book in 1961.

Her first book, Historien om Tamar og Trine from 1958, is a story about a sailor's family who has adopted children from different parts of the world. The book contained the song "Jorden snurrer rundt og rundt med barn på alle kanter", which found its way into songbooks for schoolchildren. The sequels Tai-mi, Tamar og Trines søster and Tom Tangloppe, bror til Tamar, Trine og Ta-mi, were published in 1959 and 1960, respectively. From 1964 she wrote several television shows for children.

Her trilogy Tørris (1967–1969) treats the life in a rural society in the mid 19th century from a child's perspective. The boy "Tørris" grows up with parents, grandparents, siblings and animals around him, in an idyllic narrative. Both the books about "Tamar" and "Trine" and the series about "Tørris" were illustrated by Borghild Rud.

Brænne was awarded Riksmålsforbundet's honorary prize in 1956.
She died in Oslo in 1976.

References

External links
 

1918 births
1976 deaths
Actresses from Oslo
Norwegian stage actresses
Norwegian children's writers
Norwegian women children's writers
Norwegian songwriters
NRK people
Norwegian radio actresses
20th-century Norwegian women writers
20th-century Norwegian actresses
Writers from Oslo